Real (stylized as ЯeaL) is a Japanese all-girl rock band from Osaka Prefecture which is signed to SME Records. Originally consisting of members Ryoko, Yurika, Fumiha, and Aika, they began their activities in 2012. They made their major debut in 2016 with the release of their single . In 2016 their song  was used as an opening theme in the anime television series Gin Tama. Yurika left the band following a music tour to promote their first album 19 in 2017. The band's music has also been featured in Pokémon The Series: Sun & Moon and Boruto: Naruto Next Generations.

History
Members Ryoko and Yurika met while in junior high school. Yurika had originally considered pursuing a career as a voice actor, but instead decided to take up music. Ryoko joined a school music contest alone and placed as a finalist, and decided to team up with Yurika to increase their chances of winning, although they would ultimately end up losing. Nevertheless, the two decided to continue on collaborating and form a band. They would be joined by two further members: Fumiha, who the two had known from online exchanges, and Fumiha's schoolmate Aika. The name "ЯeaL" was chosen because of a desire to use a "cool" English word. At the time, Yurika settled on the word "Real" but found it to be uninteresting, but after discovering the Cyrillic letter Я, she decided to incorporate that in the band's name. She found the letter appropriate, as it would represent the showing of the "real inside and outside" of the band, while also reflecting the letter's use as a Russian word for "I".

The band began performing at various live houses in Osaka, but initially did not gain much popularity, almost leading to their dissolution. Eventually, the band's popularity began to increase, and they ended up competing in the Eo Music Try contest in 2013, where they placed as a finalist. During this time they also released their first self-produced CD. In 2014 the band released the mini-album Change Your Real. In 2015, the band performed at Summer Sonic, a large music festival in Osaka, where they received two awards and praise from judges.

The band made its major debut under SME Records in 2016, releasing their first major single  on March 9 of that year. Their second major single  was released on August 3, 2016; the title song was used as an opening theme in the TBS television program Rank Ōkoku. Their third single  was released on March 1, 2017; the title song is used as an opening theme in the anime television series Gin Tama. They released their first album 19. on May 10, 2017. Following the album's release, Yurika announced that she would be leaving the band following the end of their album promotional tour, leaving Ryoko, Fumiha, and Aika as remaining members.

The band's fourth single  was released on May 2, 2018; the title song is used as an opening theme in the anime series Pokémon the Series: Sun & Moon – Ultra Adventures. The band also made voice cameos in an episode of the series. Their fifth single  was released on February 20, 2019; the title song is used as an opening theme in the anime series Boruto: Naruto Next Generations. Their second major album  was released on September 16, 2020.

Members

Current members
 Ryoko (born December 12, 1997) – Guitar, lead vocalist. She is also active as a solo singer under the stage name .
 Fumiha (born August 30, 1997) – Bass, chorus
 Aika (born February 11, 1998) – Drums, chorus

Former members
 Yurika (born August 12, 1997) – Guitar, chorus

Discography

Singles

Albums

Mini-albums

References

External links
 ЯeaL Official Site  - new official website after independence.
 Official website  - former official site of the Sony Music era.
 
 

Anime musical groups
Japanese pop music groups
Japanese rock music groups
Musical groups established in 2012
Musical groups from Osaka Prefecture
Sony Music Entertainment Japan artists
2012 establishments in Japan